Solidago radula, the western rough goldenrod, is a North American plant species in the family Asteraceae. It is found primarily in the southern Great Plains and the Mississippi Valley of the United States (from Texas to Illinois), with isolated populations farther east in Kentucky, Georgia, and the Carolinas.

Solidago radula is a perennial herb up to 90 cm (3 feet) tall, with a caudex and rhizomes. Lower leaves can be up to 10 cm (4 inches) long, leaves higher on the stem much smaller. One plant can produce as many as 260 small yellow flower heads in a branching array. The species grows in open rocky places and in dry woodlands.

References

External links
Photo of herbarium specimen at Missouri Botanical Garden, collected in Missouri in 1987
Photo of herbarium specimen at Missouri Botanical Garden, collected in Missouri in 1993
Lady Bird Johnson Wildflower Center, University of Texas
Missouri Plants photos, description

radula
Plants described in 1834
Flora of the United States